The pear slug or cherry slug is the larva of the sawfly, Caliroa cerasi, a nearly worldwide pest. The species was first described by Carl Linnaeus in his landmark 1758 10th edition of Systema Naturae. They are not slugs but are a kind of sawfly of the family Tenthredinidae.  The pear slug is an important pest that eats leaves of cherry, pear, and plum trees, leaving behind a skeleton of veins.  The larvae cover themselves in green slime, making themselves unpalatable to predators. The larva molt between five to eight times before being fully grown. When the larvae are fully grown, they drop from the tree to the ground and pupate underground.  The adult sawfly emerges from the pupal case and climbs from the soil to mate and lays eggs on the leaves of the host plant, completing the life cycle.

Other sources dispute the notion that the females climb the tree to lay their eggs, claiming instead that they fly to the tree. This is an important detail in regard to their control in horticultural circumstances where glues are used to control climbing pests.

References

External links
 Australian Insects

Itis classification
The sawflies (Symphyta) of Britain and Ireland
 
 

Tenthredinidae
Sawflies described in 1758
Taxa named by Carl Linnaeus